The Standish Group International, Inc. or Standish Group is an independent international IT research advisory firm founded in 1985, known from their reports about information systems implementation projects in the public and private sector.  The firm focuses on mission-critical software applications, especially focussing on failures and possible improvements in IT projects. The Standish Group has reported on subjects such as software: commercial, free, and open source; project management such as critical chain project management;  projects such as Confirm Project, etc.

Authors  

 Jim Crear
 Lee Gesmer
 Jim Johnson
 Jennifer Lynch
 Hans Mulder
 Theo Mulder
 Lou Vianna

References

External links 
 Standish Group website

Information technology companies of the United States
American companies established in 1985
Technology companies established in 1985